Last Patrol is the ninth studio album by American rock band Monster Magnet. It is the first recording since their 1991 debut album Spine of God not to feature long time member Ed Mundell who left the band shortly after their 2010 album Mastermind.

Last Patrol sold around 2,300 copies in the United States in its first week of release, peaking at no. 188 on the Billboard Top 200.

Frontman Dave Wyndorf described the album as "a return to our roots in terms of vibe and recording style. It's full-on psychedelic space-rock with a '60s garage feel, recorded almost exclusively with vintage guitars, amps and effects in our hometown of Red Bank, New Jersey. The songs are a kind of space-noir, tales of cosmic revenge, peaking libidos, alienation and epic strangeness. It's a weird trip through the back alleys of a dark, retro-future, which not by coincidence very much resembles my own life. [laughs] The lyrics aren't fantasy really, rather a recounting of my musings on, observations of and general emotional reaction to my life and environment during a 1 week writing period in February of 2013. But I tend to use the vernacular and imagery of science fiction and surrealism to express myself and that's where these lyrics get trippy. There's also our cover version of Donovan's 'Three Kingfishers', which I thought fit the mood of the album."

The band would perform the entire album for each show of the European leg in January and February 2014.

Track listing 
All tracks written by Dave Wyndorf except where stated.
 "I Live Behind the Clouds" – 4:25
 "Last Patrol" – 9:23
 "Three Kingfishers" (Donovan) – 4:33
 "Paradise" – 4:31
 "Hallelujah" – 4:13
 "Mindless Ones" – 5:30
 "The Duke of Supernature" (Wyndorf, Phil Caivano) – 4:59
 "End of Time" – 7:45
 "Stay Tuned" – 5:54
 "Strobe Light Beatdown" – 4:26 (bonus track)
 "One Dead Moon" – 5:19 (bonus track)

Personnel 
 Dave Wyndorf – guitar, keyboards, vocals
 Philip Caivano – bass, guitar
 Bob Pantella – percussion, drums
 Garrett Sweeny – guitar, sitar

Production and art
 Tim Cronin – contributor
 Dave Wyndorf – producer
 Philip Caivano – producer
 Matt Hyde – additional production
 Joe Barresi – mixing
 Ryan Smith – mastering
 John Sumrow – paintings, cover art

Chart positions

References 

Monster Magnet albums
2013 albums
Napalm Records albums